Sophia Al Maria (صافية المرية) (born 1983) is a Qatari-American artist, writer, and filmmaker. Her work has been exhibited at the Gwangju Biennale, the New Museum in New York, and the Architectural Association School of Architecture in London. Her writing has appeared in Harper's Magazine, Five Dials, Triple Canopy, and Bidoun.

She works with the concept of "Gulf Futurism".

Her memoir The Girl Who Fell To Earth was published by Harper Perennial on November 27, 2012.

Early life and education
Sophia Al Maria was born to an American mother hailing from Puyallup, Washington and a Qatari father. She spent time in both countries during her childhood. She studied comparative literature at the American University in Cairo, and aural and visual cultures at Goldsmiths, University of London. After her studies at Goldsmiths, University of London, Al Maria relocated to the Gulf, where she worked towards opening Mathaf contemporary art museum, alongside the curators Wassan Al-Khudhairi and Deena Chalabi. Al Maria cites the experience as being a formative one, where she was 'tasked with meeting and interviewing artists like Hassan Sharif or Zineb Sedira—that was my real art education. Having that proximity was, in a weird way, how I got into artmaking.'

Gulf Futurism
Gulf Futurism is a term coined by Sophia Al Maria to explain an existing phenomenon she has observed in architecture, urban planning, art, aesthetics and popular culture in the post-oil Persian Gulf.

Her interest in these areas arises from her youth growing up in the Persian Gulf area during the 1980s and 1990s, experiences she describes in The Girl Who Fell To Earth.

Definition
Sharing some qualities with 20th century movements like Futurism, Gulf Futurism is evident in the agenda of the dominant class of this region, concerned with master planning and world building, and with a local youth culture that exhibits an asset bubble fuelled sense of entitlement and is preoccupied with fast cars and fast technology.
 
“The Arabian Gulf is a region that has been hyper-driven into a present made up of interior wastelands, municipal master plans and environmental collapse, thus making it a projection of a global future."
 
The themes and ideas present in Gulf Futurism include the isolation of individuals via technology, wealth and reactionary Islam, the corrosive elements of consumerism on the soul and industry on the earth, the replacement of history with glorified heritage fantasy in the collective memory and in many cases, the erasure of existing physical surroundings.
 
Informed by texts such as Baudrillard’s The Illusion of the End, As-Sufi’s Islamic Book of the Dead and Žižek’s Welcome to the Desert of the Real, Gulf Futurism also uses imagery from Islamic eschatology, corporate ideology, posthumanism and the global mythos of Science Fiction.

Origins
The concept originated in a 2009 essay called “The Gaze of Sci Fi Wahabi” which was made available as a limited edition book and can also be seen on a related website. More recently it was the subject of a feature entitled "Deserts of the Unreal"  in Dazed & Confused magazine which declares the article gives "the scoop on Gulf futurist and video artist Sophia Al-Maria" and states “Sophia Al-Maria coined the term Gulf Futurism” ,  Renowned science fiction author Bruce Sterling discussed the concept in two of his regular columns in Wired Magazine.

The influential Dutch art institution Impakt, which presents critical and creative views on contemporary media culture and innovative audiovisual arts in an interdisciplinary context included discussion of the concept during its 2012 festival, stating in its catalogue for the exhibition "No More Westerns" that 
"Sophia Al-Maria is interested in that which is coming. Her work as a writer, filmmaker and artist focuses on Gulf Futurism and the inkling that the state of the contemporary Arabian Gulf is a premonition of our global future. Her project “Sci-Fi Wahabi,” as illustrated by videos and essays, is an epic deep-dive into a displaced futurism that can only be glimpsed through the contemporary-surrealism of the Gulf States".

The concept is also cited by the website “Islam and Science Fiction”.

Scout

This interest is further explored in "Scout", her entry for the 2012 edition of the internationally renowned art event Gwangju Biennale.  “Scout”, is a sculpture and sound installation which makes use of an echoing voice inside a mysterious fibre glass sculpture. The soundtrack includes an Arabic excerpt from the 1977 Voyager spacecraft's golden record of sounds from Earth and its inhabitants. This piece was reviewed in the leading art magazine Flash Art.

References

External links
 Al-Maria, Sophia (2013-05-13). Chewing the Data Fat.
 On Automobiles: Sophia Al-Maria talks to Omar Kholeif.

Living people
Qatari women writers
American artists
American women writers
Qatari expatriates in the United States
Qatari contemporary artists
Qatari women artists
American people of Qatari descent
1983 births
21st-century American women